Frederick Bancroft Willis (May 18, 1904 – October 2, 1971) was an American politician who served as Speaker of the Massachusetts House of Representatives from 1945 to 1948.

Early life
Willis was born on May 18, 1904 in Saugus, Massachusetts. He attended Saugus High School, Northeastern University, and the Boston University School of Law.

Political career

Willis was a member of the Saugus School Committee from 1930 to 1936. He also worked as the Town Counsel and Secretary of Assessors.

From 1937 to 1949 he was a member of the Massachusetts House of Representatives. In 1939 he was appointed Chairman of the Commission on Civil Service. While serving in this role he authored the Civil Service Reform Act. From 1943 to 1944 he was the House Majority Leader, Chairman of the Special Commission on Postwar Rehabilitation, and Chairman on the House Committee on Aeronautics. While on the Aeronautics Committee, Willis helped turn Logan Airport into a modern facility.

Willis was Speaker of the House from 1944 to 1948. He served as a delegate to Republican National Convention from Massachusetts in 1940 and 1948. He did not run for reelection after the 1948-49 legislative session, instead he became Counsel to the House of Representatives. Willis remained House Counsel until his retirement in 1969.

Later life, death, and legacy
After leaving the House, Willis moved to Lynn, Massachusetts.

Willis died on October 2, 1971 in Lynn.

The Frederick B. Willis Fishing Pier in Lynn is dedicated to him.

See also
 Massachusetts legislature: 1937–1938, 1939, 1941–1942, 1943–1944, 1945–1946, 1947–1948

References

1904 births
1971 deaths
Boston University School of Law alumni
Northeastern University alumni
Politicians from Lynn, Massachusetts
People from Saugus, Massachusetts
Republican Party members of the Massachusetts House of Representatives
Speakers of the Massachusetts House of Representatives
School board members in Massachusetts
20th-century American politicians